, son of Motohira, was a kugyō or Japanese court noble of the Kamakura period (1185–1333). He held a regent position kampaku from 1289 and 1291 and from 1293 to 1296. He had sons Tsunehira with a daughter of Emperor Kameyama and Iehira with a daughter of regent Takatsukasa Kanehira.

References

Fujiwara clan
Konoe family
1261 births
1296 deaths
People of Kamakura-period Japan